Horst Schönau (born 2 April 1949 in Waltershausen, Thuringia) is an East German bobsledder who competed in the late 1970s and early 1980s. He won a bronze medal in the four-man event at the 1980 Winter Olympics in Lake Placid.

Schönau also won a complete set of medals at the FIBT World Championships with a gold (Four-man: 1978), a silver (Two-man: 1981), and a bronze (Two-man: 1982).

References
 Bobsleigh four-man Olympic medalists for 1924, 1932–56, and since 1964
 Bobsleigh two-man world championship medalists since 1931
 Bobsleigh four-man world championship medalists since 1930
 

1949 births
Living people
People from Waltershausen
German male bobsledders
Bobsledders at the 1976 Winter Olympics
Bobsledders at the 1980 Winter Olympics
Olympic bobsledders of East Germany
Olympic bronze medalists for East Germany
Olympic medalists in bobsleigh
National People's Army military athletes
Sportspeople from Thuringia
Medalists at the 1980 Winter Olympics